Pascagama Lake is a freshwater body of the eastern part of Senneterre in La Vallée-de-l'Or Regional County Municipality (RCM), in the administrative region of Abitibi-Témiscamingue, in the province of Quebec, in Canada. This body of water extends in the townships of Deschamps, Logan and Bernier.

Forestry is the main economic activity of the sector.

The hydrographic slope of lake Pascagama is accessible through some forest roads serving several peninsulas. The surface of the river is usually frozen from early November to the end of April, however, safe ice circulation is generally from early December to mid-April.

Geography 

The main hydrographic slopes near Pascagama Lake are:
North side: Pascagama River, Chartrand River, Aigle River (Doda Lake);
East side: Suzie River, Bernier Lake, Mégiscane River;
South side: Mégiscane River, Cedar Lake, Suzie River, Jack Lake;
West side: Mégiscane River, Dumont Lake, Ouiscatis Lake.

Toponymy
The term "Pascagama" is of Algonquin origin and refers to a camp, dam, lake and river.

The name "Lac Pascagama" was officialized on December 5, 1968 by the Commission de toponymie du Québec when it was created.

Notes and references

See also 

Lakes of Abitibi-Témiscamingue
Nottaway River drainage basin